Dennis Paul Anderson (born 1970 in Las Vegas, Nevada) is an American politician and a Republican member of the Nevada Assembly from 2012 to 2017 representing District 13. Anderson is also the founder and president of a technology company named AndersonPC, founded in 1996.

Anderson resigned in 2017 to take a job with the Governor's Office of Economic Development.

In July 2018, Anderson joined Boyd Gaming replacing Bill Noonan, who retired, as the Senior Vice President of Industry and Governmental Affairs.

Education
Anderson earned his BS in business and finance from Chapman University.

Elections
2012 when Republican Assemblyman Scott Hammond ran for Nevada Senate and left the House District 13 seat open, Anderson won the June 12, 2012 Republican Primary with 1,680 votes (68.49%) and won the November 6, 2012 General election with 14,271 votes (54.20%) against Democratic nominee Louis Desalvio, who had run for the seat in 2010.
2014 Republican Assemblyman Paul Anderson was re-elected to Assembly District 13.  Anderson ran unopposed in the June Primary election and won the November 4th, 2014 with 9,493 votes (62.28%) against Democratic nominee Christine Kramar.
 2016 Republican Assemblyman Paul Anderson was re-elected to Assembly District 13.  Anderson won the June, 2016 primary with 62.16% of the vote against two Republican opponents Steve Sanson and Leonard Foster.  Anderson won the November general election with 23,897 votes running unopposed.

Nevada State Legislative Service

Years in Assembly 
November 2012 to September 2017

Leadership  
Assembly Majority Floor Leader, 2015; 2015 Special Session; and 2016 Special Session

Assembly Minority Floor Leader, 2017

Interim Finance Committee: 2013; 2015; 2017 (part)

Served as Vice Chair from January 22, 2015, to February 1, 2015,

Served as chair from February 2, 2015, to November 7, 2016

Assembly Committees  
Commerce and Labor (2015; 2017)

Natural Resources, Agriculture, and Mining (2013)

Taxation (2017)

Transportation (2013)

Ways and Means (2013; 2015, chair; 2017)

Interim Committees  
Advisory Committee to Develop a Plan to Reorganize the Clark County School District (A.B. 394) (2015-2016)

Commission on Educational Technology (2013-2014; 2015–2016)

Committee to Consult With the Director (2013-2014; 2015–2016)

Information Technology Advisory Board (2013-2014; 2015–2016)

Interim Finance Committee's Subcommittee to Review and Advise on the Development of Priorities and Performance Based Budgeting (PPBB) by the Department of Administration, Budget Division (2013-2014)

Interim Retirement and Benefits Committee (2015-2016)

Technological Crime Advisory Board (2013-2014)

References

External links
 Official page at the Nevada Legislature
 Campaign site
 
 Biography at Ballotpedia
 Financial information (state office) at the National Institute for Money in State Politics

Date of birth missing (living people)
1970 births
Living people
Chapman University alumni
Republican Party members of the Nevada Assembly
Politicians from Las Vegas
21st-century American politicians